Herzliya is an affluent city in the central coast of Israel, at the northern part of the Tel Aviv District, known for its robust start-up and entrepreneurial culture. Its western, beachfront area is called Herzliya Pituah and is one of Israel's most affluent neighborhoods and home to numerous embassies, ambassadors' residences, companies headquarters and houses of prominent Israeli business people.

History

Herzliya, named after Theodor Herzl, was founded in 1924 as a semi-cooperative farming community (moshava) with a mixed population of new immigrants and veteran residents. During that year, 101 houses and 35 cowsheds were built there, and the village continued to grow. The 1931 census  recorded a population of 1,217 inhabitants, in 306 houses. 
Upon the establishment of the state in 1948, Herzliya was a town of 5,300. Large numbers of immigrants settled there, and it had 12,000 residents within a few years. In 1960, when the population reached 25,000, Herzliya was declared a city.

Under current plans, the city's population will triple to around 290,000 by 2030, with 52,000 new homes and new industrial developments and hotels built, with more dense construction in the city center while expanding the city to the north and southwest.

Demographics
According to the Israel Central Bureau of Statistics, residents of Herzliya are among the wealthiest in Israel. In 2003–2005, average monthly salaries were ILS 8,211, or about ILS 1,500 above average in a survey of Israel's 15 largest cities. However, there is a large gap between the city's seven working-class neighborhoods, among them Yad Tisha, Neve Yisrael and Neve Amal, and upscale Herzliya Pituah. The population is older than that of other cities in the Sharon region: 18% are under 14 years old, compared to a national average of 27.5%.

Education and culture

Investment in education was higher than all other cities in the survey and more high school students were eligible for a bagrut matriculation certificate. The Herzliya Interdisciplinary Center is a private college that was founded in 1994 by Prof. Uriel Reichman, who serves as its president to this day.

Israel's largest television and film studio, Herzliya Studios (Ulpanei Herzliya), is located in Herzliya, Also RGE studios that serviced the Kids channel and Sport 5 channel. the IDC television and radio center located in the city with some other local radio stations like Eco99fm and 103fm. The Herzliya Marina was built in the 1970s. The city has a small airport, three shopping malls (Arena Mall, Seven Stars Mall and the Outlet), movie theaters, museums, cultural centers and a stadium. In 2008, the Herzliya Cinematheque opened in the downtown area of the city.

Local government
In a 2008 survey of 15 Israeli cities, Herzliya ranked second in fiscal management. The Herzliya municipality ended 2006 with a sizeable budget surplus.

Mayors

 
 Avraham Raphael Hirsch, 1937–38
 Shmuel Zeev ("Shin-Zayin") Levin, 1938–43
 Ben Zion Michaeli, 1943–60
 Pesah Yifhar, 1960–66
 Interim council led by Natan Rosenthal, 1966–67
 Yosef Nevo, 1969–83
 Eli Landau, 1983–98 (Likud)
 Yael German, 1998–2013 (Meretz, later independent)
 Yehonatan Yas'ur, 2013
 Moshe Fadlon, 2013–

Landmarks

One of the founders' homes has been turned into a museum Beit Rishonim documenting the history of Herzliya. The Herzliya Museum of Art is part of the Yad Labanim memorial complex. West of Herzliya is Sidna Ali, a Muslim holy site. To the northwest is Tel Arsaf (Arsuf) and the Apollonia National Park. Inhabited from the Persian period until the Crusader period, the site contains the remains of the Crusader town of Arsuf, including a fortress surrounded by a moat.

Herzliya Conference
Since its inception in 2000, the Herzliya Conference has become an annual summit of the most influential Israeli and international leaders. The conference is attended by government ministers, Knesset members, senior defense officials, leaders of the Israeli business community, senior academicians, media representatives from Israel and abroad, delegates of world Jewish organizations, foreign dignitaries and Israeli diplomats.

Sports 

The city has two football clubs, Maccabi Herzliya and Hapoel Herzliya, both of which are based at the 8,100-capacity Herzliya Municipal Stadium. The Bnei Herzliya basketball club plays its games in the HaYovel high school arena. Herzliya is also one of the centers of rugby union in Israel.

One of the city's main attractions is Sportek Herzliya, an outdoor, 30 acres, sports compound open for public usage.

Transportation
The city is served by the Herzliya railway station, which provides connections to Tel Aviv, Jerusalem, Beersheva, as well as to Ben Gurion Airport. The station is located in the middle of Highway 20.

Herzliya Pituah

Some of Israel's most expensive homes and finest beaches are in Herzliya Pituah, a neighborhood on the west side of Herzliya. Herzliya Pituach is a sought-after venue for high-tech companies, and its marina, many restaurants and entertainment spots have turned this part of Herzliya into a vibrant hub of Israeli nightlife.

Arab–Israeli conflict
A makeshift strip located around the current Herzliya Airport was used as the main operating base of Israel's first true fighter aircraft (as opposed to makeshift use of light planes), Avia S-199, during 1948 Arab–Israeli War. The airfield was used as it was a bit back from the front-lines, and was clandestine since it was a purpose built strip, that was constructed after the beginning of hostilities, in between the orange orchards around Herzliya, and didn't appear on published maps.

On June 11, 2002, Hadar Hershkowitz (14) was killed in the 2002 Herzliya shawarma restaurant bombing. On May 30, 2006, Re'ut Feldman (20), a resident of Herzliya, was killed in the Kedumim bombing.

Twin towns – sister cities

Herzliya is twinned with:

 Alicante, Spain
 Banská Bystrica, Slovakia
 Beverly Hills, United States
 Columbus, United States
 Dnipro, Ukraine
 Funchal, Portugal
 Hollywood, United States
 Leipzig, Germany
 Marl, Germany
 Paphos, Cyprus
 San Bernardino, United States
 San Isidro, Argentina

Notable people

Adi Ashkenazi (born 1975), comedian and actress
Tal Brody (born 1943), basketball player
Nochi Dankner (born 1954), businessman and billionaire
Maayan Davidovich (born 1988), Olympic windsurfer
Abba Eban (1915–2002), statesman, Foreign Affairs Minister, US and UN ambassador
Gadi Eizenkot (born 1960), IDF Chief of General Staff
Tal Flicker (born 1992), judoka
Carine Goren (born 1974), pastry chef, cookbook author, television baking show host
Yaniv Green (born 1980), basketball player
Meir Har-Zion (1934–2014), military commando
Chaim Herzog (1918–1997), 6th Israeli President
Ágnes Keleti (born 1921), gymnast, winner of 10 Olympic medals
Amos Mansdorf (born 1965), Israeli tennis player
Roy Nissany (born 1994), racing driver
Mimi Reinhardt (1915-2022), Oskar Schindler's secretary, spent her last years here 
Alice Schlesinger (born 1988), Olympic judoka
Keren Siebner (born 1990), Olympic swimmer
Alona Tal (born 1983), actress and singer
Yehuda Weinstein (born 1944), lawyer and Attorney General of Israel

References

External links 

 

 
Sharon plain
Cities in Tel Aviv District
1924 establishments in Mandatory Palestine
Populated places established in 1924
Theodor Herzl